Karuppilakattalai is a village in the Ariyalur taluk of Ariyalur district, Tamil Nadu, India.

Demographics 

 census, Karuppilakattalai had a total population of 3585 with 1777 males and 1808 females.

References 

Villages in Ariyalur district